The men's shot put event  at the 1991 IAAF World Indoor Championships was held on 8 March.

Results

References

Shot
Shot put at the World Athletics Indoor Championships